Alvecote Pools is a Site of Special Scientific Interest (SSSI) and nature reserve situated alongside the River Anker, adjacent to the hamlet of Alvecote on the border of Warwickshire and Staffordshire in England. The majority of the reserve lies in the former county. First notified in 1955, the site has been owned by the Warwickshire Wildlife Trust since 1997.

The site is effectively a series of shallow pools alongside the river that have arisen as an effect of colliery subsidence from Alvecote Colliery, which was later merged to form North Warwickshire Colliery and which ceased operation in 1965. In addition to the wetland habitat, there are areas of fen, reedbed and woodland. As a result, the area is regionally important for bird life, and over 100 species are reported annually, with between 60 and 70 breeding. The site is also important for beetles, with 322 species recorded, and spiders (121 species).

References

External links
 Natural England SSSI unit listing
 Map with SSSI area highlighted at natureonthemap.org.uk 

Sites of Special Scientific Interest in Warwickshire
Nature reserves in Warwickshire
Tourist attractions in Warwickshire
Warwickshire Wildlife Trust